St. Mary's Church is a Catholic parish located in Ballston Spa, New York. It is located within the Roman Catholic Diocese of Albany. Father Francis R. Vivacqua is the current pastor. St. Mary's is the fourth oldest parish in the Diocese. St. Mary's of Ballston Spa has a mission church, St. Mary's of Galway.

School 
St. Mary's Catholic School is located next to the church in Ballston Spa. Students grades K–5 are enrolled at the school, and there is also a pre-school. The current principal is Lynn Fitzgerald.

References

External links
Official website

Churches in Saratoga County, New York
Roman Catholic churches in New York (state)
Roman Catholic parishes of Diocese of Albany
Roman Catholic churches completed in 1867
19th-century Roman Catholic church buildings in the United States